Tlalixtac may refer to:

Tlalixtac de Cabrera
Santa María Tlalixtac